Vanetta may refer to:
Matteo Vanetta (born 1978), Swiss football coach and player
Vanetta, West Virginia, United States

See also
Vonetta Flowers (born 1973), American athlete
Vonetta McGee (1945–2010), American actress